Amphimallon evorense is a species of beetle in the Melolonthinae subfamily that is endemic to Portugal.

References

Beetles described in 1913
evorense
Endemic arthropods of Portugal
Beetles of Europe